The 2013 Norwegian Football Cup was the 108th season of the Norwegian annual knockout football tournament. It began with qualification matches in March 2013. The first round was played 17 April 2013 and the tournament ended with the final on 24 November 2013, which Molde won by beating Rosenborg 4–2.

The victory earned Molde a place in the second qualifying round of the 2014–15 UEFA Europa League.

Calendar
Below are the dates for each round as given by the official schedule:

Sources:

First round
The 48 winners from the Second Qualifying Round joined with 80 clubs from the Premier League, First Division and Second Division in this round of the competition. The matches took place on 16, 17 and 18 April 2013.

|colspan="3" style="background-color:#97DEFF"|16 April 2013

|-
|colspan="3" style="background-color:#97DEFF"|17 April 2013

{{OneLegResult|Mjølner||1–5|Harstad}}
|-
|colspan="3" style="background-color:#97DEFF"|18 April 2013|}

Second round
The 64 winners from the First Round were scheduled to play in this round of the competition. The matches took place on 1 and 2 May 2013.

|colspan="3" style="background-color:#97DEFF"|1 May 2013|-
|colspan="3" style="background-color:#97DEFF"|2 May 2013|}

Third round
The 32 winners from the Second Round were scheduled to play in this round of the competition. The matches took place on 29 and 30 May 2013.

|colspan="3" style="background-color:#97DEFF"|29 May 2013|-
|colspan="3" style="background-color:#97DEFF"|30 May 2013'''

|}

Fourth round
The 16 winners from the Third Round were scheduled to play in this round of the competition. The matches took place on 19 and 26 June 2013.

Quarter-finals
The 8 winners from the Fourth Round were scheduled to play in this round of the competition. The matches took place on 3, 4 July and 21 August 2013.

Semi-finals
The 4 winners from the Quarter-finals were scheduled to play in this round of the competition. The matches took place on 25 and 26 September 2013.

Final 

The 2013 Norwegian Football Cup Final was played between Rosenborg and Molde at Ullevaal Stadion in Oslo on 24 November 2013.

Statistics

Top goalscorers

References 

 
Norwegian Football Cup seasons
Cup
Norway